Fred (Frédéric) Belaubre (born 14 February 1980 in Poissy), is a French professional triathlete. He was the European Champion of the years 2005, 2006, and 2008, the French Champion of the years 2007 and 2010. Belaubre took part in two Olympic Games, placing 5th in Athens (2004) and 10th in Beijing (2008).

Sports career 
Fred Belaubre lives in St. Raphael and is part of the nearby high performance centre CREPS PACA in Boulouris, to which he was admitted in 1996.
Since 2009, as in the years 2006–2007, his coach has been Pierre Houseaux, the head of the triathlon section of the Pôle Boulouris.
In France, Fred Belaubre represents the club Beauvais Triathlon, for which he could win the silver medal in the prestigious Club Championship Series Lyonnaise des Eaux in 2009.
In 2010, Belaubre also represented EJOT in the German Bundesliga circuit. In 2011, when his French club Beauvais will boycott the French Club Championship series Lyonnaise des Eaux, he will again represent EJOT, like his teammate Charlotte Morel.

Private 
According to French press reports, Fred Belaubre and Charlotte Morel, who is also part of the elite centre CREPS PACA in Boulouris and the elite team of Beauvais, are a couple.

Fred Belaubre's father, Georges Belaubre, is also a well-known triathlete and in 2010, at the age of 66, he won the national championships in his age group (V6).

ITU Competitions 
Fred Belaubre started to take part in ITU events in 1999, at the age of 19. In 2000 he could win the gold medal at the Junior World Championships.
From 2001 on, he has only taken part in elite competitions.

In April 2011, Belaubre opened the new season with two European Cup silver medals.
In the twelve years from 1999 to 2010 Belaubre took part in 58 ITU competitions and achieved 28 top ten positions, the most recent of which in 2009.

The following list is based upon the official rankings and the athlete's ITU Profile Page. Unless indicated otherwise, the following events are triathlons (Olympic Distance) and belong to the Elite category.

BG = the sponsor British Gas · DNF = did not finish · DNS = did not start · DQ = disqualified

External links 

 Fred Belaubre's Homepage in French
 Fred Belaubre's club Beauvais Triathlon in French

Notes 

French male triathletes
1980 births
Living people
Olympic triathletes of France
20th-century French people
21st-century French people